Stainton is a village and a civil parish in the South Lakeland district, in the county of Cumbria, England, situated near the village of Sedgwick and the town of Kendal. It is near the main A590 road. Killington reservoir runs alongside the parish of Stainton.

In the 19th century John Bartholomew described Stainton as follows:

"Stainton, township and vil., Heversham par., Westmorland, in S. of co.- township, 1735 ac., pop. 388; vil., 4 miles S. of Kendal; P.O."

The village of Stainton

History
The name Stainton derives from the old English meaning of stoney farm/settlement. Stān, meaning "a stone, stone, rock" and tūn meaning "an enclosure, a farmstead, a village, an estate." Stainton used to be the site of an old Roman settlement and is built on limestone.
It is situated south east of the lake district national park, 5.3 miles south of the town of Kendal. The Lancaster Canal runs close to Stainton approximately 1 km south of the village.   
The village is home to a small chapel, post office and 128 houses. The chapel, which was "erected in 1698" is no longer used for religious reasons. In 2003 work started to convert it into a village hall and, ten years later, it was handed on 22 November 2013 to the charity that had funded this project.

Historical monuments

The rich history of the area can be observed by monuments which include a series of bridges across Stainton Beck (Stainton bridge, a packhorse bridge and an aqueduct carrying the Lancaster Canal), Selet Hall and the parish church (St Thomas' Church in the neighbouring village of Crosscrake). 

Wainwright wrote about the history stating that "it is a place of great antiquity" and also about how pleasant the parish was.
The historical monuments could provide key data about the parish itself. What it was like in the past and also possibly what it will be like in the future, along with giving the parish character, pleasant surroundings and attractions.

Population over time
 This is a chart showing the population statistics for Stainton between 1881 and 2011 received from census data. In 1941, there was no census so no recorded data. Over time, there have not been any substantial fluctuations in the data and the population seems to have kept at a steady rate. In 1881 the recorded population was 388 and the most recent record was 313. The lack of major fluctuations could suggest that the boundary of the parish hasn't moved over the years and there have been no major inputs and outputs into the village. Peter Wood states that in the past "people rarely moved far away and were often related to each other" which could be the reason for such a stable trend.

1881 Occupation Roles

This table shows the occupation roles of the population of Stainton in the year 1881. It also splits the occupations into males (blue) and females (orange). As this data from the vision of Britain shows, other than the unidentified jobs there was a high proportion of workers in the agricultural and animals sector. However these were all males which shows it was possibly a very labour-intensive job but it also suggests the surroundings of the parish were mostly countryside. This was confirmed in the book about the history and topography of Westmoreland when T.F.Bulmer stated that " a large portion of the township is laid down in meadow and pasture." Peter Wood also backs it up by stating that a hundred years ago farms were distributed across the parish mainly run by a husband and wife with one or two children.

The second largest sector is domestic which is dominated by females at 23, compared to only two males. This could suggest that it was a traditional village in those times whereby the men went out and worked and the women stayed at home and took on domestic jobs.  Over time, however, the occupation roles seem to have shifted around. In 1881, there were only 4 professionals compared to 51 in 2011 as the graph below shows. This may be simply to the fact that there is more opportunity nowadays to take on a higher ranked job than it was previously and there is also a higher demand for disposable income.

2011 Occupation Roles

In the 2011 census the recorded number of economically active people in the parish was 226 and of those, 146 were economically active.
With this table it is possible to compare the 1881 occupation statistics with those of 2011. As the 1881 graph shows the most significant occupations other than the unknown ones were agriculture and domestic. In 1881 it is highly likely the parish would have been surrounded by farmland and there may not have been as many opportunities available as there would have been in 2011. The largest sector in 2011 was professionals and associate professionals which compared to only 4 in 1881 is a large expansion. This shows that over 130 years the dominant occupation roles have shifted from agriculture to professionals and also managers and directors. This might be due to improved transport links to larger cities and the demand for higher wages and a decrease in family run farms for a source of income. From studying the 2011 occupation statistics they suggest Stainton may have a slightly wealthy domain about it and also more of a middle aged to older aged population. The smallest sectors in 2011 were sales and administrative jobs, for example shop work or office work. This may be due to one person in a household earning a higher income so the other takes a more relaxed job role or because these types of jobs tend to have more flexible hours making it more suitable to fit around family life.

Education

In the Parish of Stainton there are 255 members who are 16 and over. As the Graph shows 219 of these have qualifications between level one and the highest level of qualification including apprenticeships. As the graph shows, 105 people who live in the village have gained a level four qualification which is the greatest percentage at 41.2% of the total number. This shows that some members of the village whether they are retired or not may have or had reasonable occupations due to their level of education. This can be backed up by looking at the occupation statistics in 2011 as 51.8% of the parish were managers/directors or in the professional sector.
Out of 255 people, 36 in the parish have no qualifications which could suggest that they didn't attend school or they didn't complete it. However it could also suggest that they may have lived their whole lives on a family run farm and taken over from previous generations.

School

There is a school at Crosscrake situated approximately one kilometre from Stainton which could be occupied by some of the parishes younger residents. 58 members of Stainton are under the age of 16 meaning that they may be in primary education as they are too young to be classed as economically active. In the book written by Peter Wood he states that some of the children who go to Crosscrake are from neighbouring parishes possibly implying Stainton as one of these. If the younger population of Stainton attend this school to gain an education it may increase their chances of a better occupation in the future.

Households

In the year 1881 the number of households in the parish of Stainton was 78. The graph took slight decrease up until 1931 where after this the number of households increased and in 2011 it stood at 128.

As you can see the first half of the household graph up until the year 1931 is similar to the population trend with a slight decrease in both. This would be expected as a decrease in population would cause a decrease in households. However, after 1931 households increased whereas the population stayed steady. This may be due to people buying second homes or housing for single people.

HOUSEHOLD TYPES

These two graphs show the number of people who live in each household in Stainton and also the type of households that dominate the parish of Stainton. The graph on the left concentrates on the number of people who occupy households in the parish. As the data shows two person households dominate the parish with 46.75% (56) houses. Owing to this dataset it could potentially mean that the houses are occupied by married couples without dependent children or even retired couples who have chosen to live in the parish. The graph also shows that there are not many houses occupied by larger families as only eight houses have five people or more in them. These few houses could be families who have dependent children, although it does not seem that there are many households of this composition so it may not entice families looking to move to live in the Stainton.
The pie chart on the right shows the type of households which are in the Parish. The majority of the homes are detached or bungalows, followed by semi-detached homes. Due to over half of the homes being detached it shows that it is unlikely that there is a street lined with houses along them. These homes may be occupied my small families, married couples or retired workers.

Economic activity
According to the 2011 census in the village there are 226 residents who are aged between 16 and 64 and 146 of these people are economically active whether it is part-time work, full-time work or self-employed. Of these 226 only one of them is unemployed and seven of them are full-time students. This is another factor that shows that it is unlikely for members of the village to be on job seekers allowance or on a relatively low income. The total number of economically inactive people stands at a total of 80 however 56 are retired and the remaining are either students or suffer from an illness. This could reinforce the suggestion that some members of the village are retirees who chose to live in the parish for a relaxing retirement with peaceful surroundings.

See also

Listed buildings in Stainton, South Lakeland

References

External links
 Cumbria County History Trust: Stainton (nb: provisional research only – see Talk page)

 
Villages in Cumbria
Civil parishes in Cumbria
South Lakeland District